The Jasmin Open is a tennis event held in Monastir, Tunisia. The first edition is currently being played in October 2022. Jasmin Open is part of the WTA Tour and is listed as a WTA 250 tournament.

The tournament was introduced in 2022 as a result of cancellation of WTA events in China due to Peng Shuai sexual assault and disappearance controversy. Another significant reason to introduce this tournament was the rise of Tunisian player, Ons Jabeur in the WTA rankings. The tournament is held at the Tennis Club de Monastir on outdoor hardcourts.

History 
The Jasmin Open Monastir was added to the 40th week of the season in May 2022 following cancellation of WTA events in China due to Peng Shuai sexual assault and disappearance controversy, who in November 2021 accused former Vice Premier Zhang Gaoli of sexual violence. As a result of Russian invasion of Ukraine at the end of February 2022, the ATP, WTA and ITF tennis governing bodies of the Grand Slams decided that Russian and Belarusian tennis players could continue to compete on the circuits, but not under the flags of Russia and Belarus until further notice.

Belgian Elise Mertens won her seventh singles title on the WTA Tour circuit. The doubles was dominated by the Czech Kateřina Siniaková and the French Kristina Mladenovic, who fulfilled the role of favorites and turned their first joint participation in doubles competitions into a trophy.

Past finals

Singles

Doubles

See also
Tunis Open
Nana Trophy
List of tennis tournaments

References

WTA Tour
Tennis tournaments in Tunisia
Hard court tennis tournaments
2022 establishments in Africa
Recurring sporting events established in 2022